
Year 903 (CMIII) was a common year starting on Saturday (link will display the full calendar) of the Julian calendar.

Events 
 By place 

 Europe 
 King Berengar I of Italy proceeds to issue concessions and privileges to the Lombard nobility and monasteries. He grants concessions to Bobbio Abbey in Emilia-Romagna (Northeast Italy).
 King Louis IV ("the Child") promulgates the Raffelstetten customs regulations, a legal document for a toll-bridge on the Danube River in Asten (modern Austria).

 Britain 
 The Danish Vikings invade Anglesey after being driven out of Dublin (see 902). They fail to gain a foothold in Wales, and sail on to Chester.
 A party of Danes under the Viking warlord Ingimundr attack the Welsh in a pitched battle at Maes Ros Meilon, perhaps near Llanfaes.

 Arabian Empire 
November 29 – Battle of Hama: Abbasid forces under Muhammad ibn Sulayman al-Katib defeat the Qarmatians near Hama, on the banks of the Orontes River (modern Syria). The Qarmatian army is scattered and pursued by Abbasid troops; Al-Husayn ibn Zikrawayh and other Qarmatian leaders are captured. 

 By topic 

 Religion 
 July – Pope Benedict IV dies after a 3-year reign. He is succeeded by Leo V as the 118th pope of the Catholic Church. Leo is imprisoned and tortured by Antipope Christopher after a reign of just 1 month. Christopher makes himself the new pope of Rome.

Births 
 December 7 – Abd al-Rahman al-Sufi, Persian astronomer (d. 986)
 Feng Yanji, chancellor of Southern Tang (d. 960) 
 Kūya, Japanese priest of Pure Land Buddhism (d. 972)
 Li Gu, chancellor of Later Zhou (d. 960)
 Wang Jun, chancellor of Later Zhou (or 902)

Deaths 
 March 6
 Lu Guangqi, Chinese official and chancellor
 Su Jian, Chinese official and chancellor
 March 26 – Sugawara no Michizane, Japanese politician and poet (b. 845)
 June 10 – Cheng Rui, Chinese warlord
 July 27– Abdallah II of Ifriqiya, Aghlabid emir
 July – Benedict IV, pope of the Catholic Church
 December 24 – Hedwiga, duchess of Saxony
 December 30 – Tian Jun, Chinese warlord (b. 858)
 Adalhard of Babenberg, Frankish nobleman
 Moses Bar-Kepha, Syriac bishop and writer
 Théodrate of Troyes, Frankish queen (b. 868)
 Zhu Yanshou, Chinese governor (b. 870)

References